Central Basin Spreading Center (formerly Central Basin Fault) is a seafloor spreading center of the West Philippine Basin.

References 
 

Oceanography